The Benaize (or ) is a  long river in the Creuse, Haute-Vienne, Vienne and Indre departments, central France. Its source is near La Souterraine. It flows generally northwest. It is a left tributary of the Anglin, into which it flows north of Saint-Hilaire-sur-Benaize.

Departments and communes along its course
This list is ordered from source to mouth: 
Creuse: La Souterraine
Haute-Vienne: Arnac-la-Poste
Creuse: Vareilles
Haute-Vienne: Saint-Sulpice-les-Feuilles, Mailhac-sur-Benaize, Cromac, Jouac, Saint-Martin-le-Mault
Indre: Bonneuil, Tilly
Haute-Vienne: Lussac-les-Églises
Vienne: Coulonges, Brigueil-le-Chantre, Thollet La Trimouille Liglet
Indre: Saint-Hilaire-sur-Benaize

References

Rivers of France
Rivers of Creuse
Rivers of Haute-Vienne
Rivers of Vienne
Rivers of Indre
Rivers of Centre-Val de Loire
Rivers of Nouvelle-Aquitaine